Larry Kirwan (born 1954 in Wexford, County Wexford) is an expatriate Irish writer and musician, most noted as the lead singer for the rock band, Black 47, and conceiver/co-writer of Paradise Square, the Broadway Musical for which he received a Tony Award nomination.

Prior to Black 47, Kirwan and fellow Wexfordian Pierce Turner were the house band in Malachy McCourt's Bells of Hell in Greenwich Village. Their music was a blend of folk, trad, progressive rock, Celtic rock and punk. Turner & Kirwan of Wexford was one of the few groups banned from CBGB’s. In the words of Hilly Kristal they were "too demonic". They then led the new wave band Major Thinkers for some years. Their song Avenue B (is the place to be) became a radio hit whereupon they were signed to Epic-Portrait Records. They recorded an album: Terrible Beauty, that was never released and after a performance in Irving Plaza on St. Patrick's Day 1985 they disbanded.

Kirwan then devoted himself to playwriting and the theatre.  However, he continued to play improvisational music behind the poet, Copernicus, and in June 1989, the Copernicus band toured West Germany, Czechoslovakia, Poland, Lithuania, and the USSR. He also formed Chill Faction with Thomas Hamlin, Major Thinkers drummer, and members of the Copernicus band, Fred Parcells, David Conrad, and Mike Fazio, all of whom would go on to play and record with Black 47.

Kirwan has written 20 plays and musicals, most of which have been performed in the United States and Europe. The plays often deal with Irish and New York history and politics. The most often produced is Liverpool Fantasy (If The Beatles hadn’t made it). Five of the plays: Liverpool Fantasy, Days of Rage, Mister Parnell, Blood and Night in the Garden are published in the book, Mad Angels. 

Kirwan collaborated on a musical: Transport, with Australian author Thomas Keneally that was produced at The Irish Repertory Theater in NYC in 2014. On April 3, 2022 his Broadway debut Paradise Square opened at the Ethel Barrymore Theatre after successful runs at Berkeley Repertory Theatre in 2019 and at The Nederlander Theatre in Chicago 2021.

Kirwan formed Black 47 with Chris Byrne in late 1989 after a jam in Paddy Reilly's Pub in Manhattan. The band has released 16 CDs including Fire of Freedom (1993) containing the hit Funky Ceili; Iraq (2008) and Bankers and Gangsters (2010). Black 47 performed approximately 2500 shows before disbanding Nov. 14th, 2014 after their final gig at BB Kings in Manhattan.

Since April 2005, he has hosted Celtic Crush, a radio show on Sirius Satellite Radio that features artists from the 8 Celtic nations who play a wide variety of genres. He also writes a weekly column for the Irish Echo. He has published several books, including a novel version of Liverpool Fantasy and Rockin' The Bronx, the latter of which was published in February 2010. His latest novel, Rockaway Blue, was published in 2021 by Three Hills/Cornell University Press.

In 2013, he co-produced a various artists compilation for Valley Entertainment titled Larry Kirwan's Celtic Invasion.

Criticism

His band has been described as 'the musical wing of the IRA’,  which was a paramilitary organisation in Northern Ireland and was designated a terrorist organisation in the United Kingdom and an illegal organisation in the Republic of Ireland. The IRA have been held responsible for the killing of 1,705 people during The Troubles.

Discography

 1971 - Aftermath - We Have No More Babies Left/Neck and Neck(Original Version)
 1973 - Turner and Kirwan of Wexford -  Neck and Neck(New Version)/When Starlings Fly
 1974 - Turner and Kirwan of Wexford - Bootleg
 1978 - Turner and Kirwan of Wexford - Absolutely and Completely
 1979 - Heretix - The Book of The Law
 1979 - Major Thinkers - Back in the 80’s/Farewell to the Coast (single)
 1982 - Major Thinkers – Avenue B is the Place to Be (single)
 1982 - Major Thinkers – Major Thinkers (Independent LP)
 1983 - Major Thinkers – Major Thinkers (EP Epic-Portrait)
 1984 - Major Thinkers – Terrible Beauty
 1987 - Chill Faction - Eggman on the Deuce
 1989 - Black 47 - Home of the Brave/Live in London
 1991 - Black 47 - Black 47
 1992 - Black 47 - Black 47 EP
 1993 - Black 47 - Fire of Freedom
 1994 - Black 47 - Home of the Brave
 1996 - Black 47 - Green Suede Shoes
 1998 - Larry Kirwan - Keltic Kids
 1999 - Black 47 - Live in New York City
 1999 - Larry Kirwan & Black 47 – I Ain’t Marchin’ Anymore
 2000 - Black 47 - Ten Bloody Years of Black 47
 2000 - Black 47 - Trouble in the Land
 2001 - Larry Kirwan - Kilroy Was Here
 2001 - Black 47 - On Fire
 2004 - Black 47 - New York Town
 2005 - Black 47 - Elvis Murphy's Green Suede Shoes
 2006 - Black 47 - Bittersweet Sixteen
 2008 - Black 47 - Iraq
 2010 - Black 47 - Bankers and Gangsters
 2011 - Black 47 - A Funky Ceili
 2012 - Larry Kirwan & Ashley Davis – Happy Xmas (War is Over)
 2013 - Various Artists - Larry Kirwan's Celtic Invasion
 2014 - Black 47 – Last Call
 2017 - Larry Kirwan - We’ll Never Feel Like This Again (Single)
 2019 - Larry Kirwan - Teddy Boy EP
 2019 - Larry Kirwan - Heroes/Belfast EP
 2020 - Larry Kirwan - Stronger and Better (Single)

Bibliography

Mad Angels (1993), Collection of five plays
Liverpool Fantasy (2003), Alternative history novel surrounding the Beatles after breaking up early in their career
Livin' In America (2004), The Songs and Stories of Black 47
Green Suede Shoes: An Irish-American Odyssey (2005), Autobiography
Rockin' The Bronx (2010): - a novel set in the Bronx in 1980-82 around the time of the passing of John Lennon and Bobby Sands.
 A History of Irish Music by Larry Kirwan (2015)
 Rockaway Blue: A Novel. (2021) - a novel set in the aftermath of 9/11.

Plays and Musicals

1.	Liverpool Fantasy - 1986 – Charas/Irish Arts Center/Dublin Theatre Festival
2.	Days of Rage  (Musical) – 1989 – Hudson Guild Theatre, NYC
3.	Mister Parnell  (Musical – 1992 – Synchronicity Space, NYC
4.	Blood  - 1993 – Synchronicity Space, NYC
5.	Night in the Garden – 1995 – Synchronicity Space, NYC
6.	The Poetry of Stone - 1998 – Synchronicity Space, NYC
7.	Against The Grain (Hip-Hop Musical) – 1999 – Chelsea Playhouse, NYC
8.	Rockin’ The Bronx - 1999 – Lehman Center for Performing Arts
9.	Groundhog Day – 2000 – Miranda Theatre Company
10.Teddy Boy (Musical) - 2003 – Workshop Production
11.The Heart Has A Mind Of Its Own – 2007 – Boomerang Theatre Company
12.Transport (Musical written with Tom Keneally) 2012 – Irish Rep Theatre
13.Hard Times (Musical) – 2012 & 2013 – The Cell, NYC
14.Rebel in the Soul - 2017 – Irish Repertory Theatre, NYC
15.IRAQ (Musical) 2018 – Workshop Montclair University NJ
16.The Catacombs/Life & Times of Brendan Behan (Musical) 2019
17.The Informer 2021 – ongoing readings Actors Gym
18.All The Rage  (Musical) 2022 – Workshop, The Cell, NYC
19.Paradise Square (Musical written with Craig Lucas, Christina Anderson) Opens April 3, 2022, Barrymore Theatre NYC
20.A Table For Two At The Dil Pickle 2022 – Irish Heritage Center, Chicago

References

External links

Black 47 band website
2001 Interview with Larry Kirwan
Kirwan's new project, the Celtic Lounge
Press release announcing Celtic Crush
2007 interview with Larry Kirwan for SiriusBackstage.com
 2012 Interview with Larry Kirwan at Twenty-Four Hours
Larry Kirwan Black 47 Archive

1954 births
Living people
Musicians from County Wexford
Irish emigrants to the United States
Celtic rock music
People from Wexford, County Wexford